"Unfair" is a song by South Korean–Chinese boy band Exo, released on December 10, 2015, as a single from their fourth extended play Sing for You. It was released in both Korean and Chinese versions by their label SM Entertainment.

Background and release 
Produced by Beat&Keys, "Unfair" described as a "pop" song with a trendy and bright melody with lyrics about a guy speaking his feelings to the girl he loves and describing her as "unfair".

Promotion 
Exo began performing the song "Unfair" on Korean music shows from December 18.

Reception 
"Unfair" debuted as number ten on Gaon Digital Chart, and at number nine at Billboard's US World Digital songs. The song is the first K-pop song to be ranked in the Best of the Week curation playlist of US's Apple Music.

Charts

Weekly charts

Monthly charts

Sales

References 

Exo songs
2015 songs
2015 singles
Korean-language songs
SM Entertainment singles
Songs written by Dean (South Korean singer)